Rubens is a 1977 Belgian drama film directed by Roland Verhavert. The film was selected as the Belgian entry for the Best Foreign Language Film at the 50th Academy Awards, but was not accepted as a nominee.

Cast
 Eddy Asselbergs as Olivares
 Robert Borremans as Velasquez
 Eddie Brugman as Peter Pourbus
 Domien De Gruyter as Nicolaas II Rockox
 Johan Leysen as Rubens
 Ann Petersen as Marie de Medicis
 Hugo Van Den Berghe as Adriaen Brouwer
 Frans Van den Brande as Hertog van Lerma
 Joris Van den Eynde as Filips
 André van den Heuvel as Caravaggio
 Martin Van Zundert as Richelieu
 Lucas Vandervost as Jacob Jordaens

See also
 List of submissions to the 50th Academy Awards for Best Foreign Language Film
 List of Belgian submissions for the Academy Award for Best Foreign Language Film

References

External links
 

1977 films
1977 drama films
1970s biographical drama films
1970s historical drama films
1970s Dutch-language films
Belgian biographical drama films
Belgian historical drama films
Films set in the 17th century
Films set in Antwerp
Films shot in Antwerp
Films directed by Roland Verhavert
Peter Paul Rubens
Cultural depictions of 17th-century painters
Cultural depictions of Belgian men
Biographical films about painters